United Nations Security Council Resolution 263, adopted on January 24, 1969, after the General Assembly passed Resolution 2479 extolling the virtues of expanded working languages, the Council decided to include Russian and Spanish among the working languages of the Security Council.

The resolution was adopted without vote.

See also
List of United Nations Security Council Resolutions 201 to 300 (1965–1971)
United Nations Security Council Resolution 345
United Nations Security Council Resolution 528

References 
Text of the Resolution at undocs.org

External links
 

 0263
Russian language
Spanish language
Language policy in the United Nations
 0263
January 1969 events